The women's slopestyle competition of the FIS Freestyle World Ski Championships 2013 was held at Myrkdalen-Voss, Norway on March 9 (qualifying and final). 
21 athletes from 11 countries competed.

Qualification 

The following are the results of the qualification.

Final 
The following are the results of the final.

References 

Slopestyle, women's